Halfdan Gyth Dehli (15 June 1881 – August 1963) was a Norwegian businessperson and aviator.

He was a son of barrister Ole Dehli (1851–1924) and women's health pioneer Maria Dehli, née Gyth (1851–1926). His sister Bergljot was married to Colonel Jacob Ager Laurantzon, and through them he was an uncle of Trygve Dehli Laurantzon.

He is best known as the director of Marinens Flyvebaatfabrikk from 1916 to 1918, and had also performed the first flight with its first aircraft M.F.1 in 1915. From 1918 to 1923 Gyth Dehli was a technical director in Det Norske Luftfartsrederi. He later settled as a farmer in Stange, then Lillehammer.

During the occupation of Norway by Nazi Germany he was imprisoned in Grini concentration camp from 13 to 21 January 1942.

References

1881 births
1963 deaths
20th-century Norwegian businesspeople
Businesspeople in aviation
Norwegian aviators
Norwegian farmers
Grini concentration camp survivors